Hannah Miller (born October 29, 1996) is an American figure skater. She is the 2014 Ice Challenge champion, 2014 Lombardia Trophy silver medalist, and 2012 JGP Final silver medalist.

Personal life 
Hannah Miller was born in Chicago, Illinois, while her father was a member of the National Hockey League's Chicago Blackhawks. She is the daughter of Cheryl Hudgens Miller and Kevin Miller, a former ice hockey player who was a member of the 1988 U.S. Olympic team and played in the NHL. She has three younger sisters, Neysa and twins Braedyn and Giselle. In June 2015, Miller graduated from Williamston High School, having earned a GPA of 4.0 and served as valedictorian at her graduation. She decided to study kinesiology at Michigan State University.

Career 
Miller began learning to skate as a four-year-old. She also trained in gymnastics before deciding to focus on skating. She was coached mainly by her paternal aunt, Kirsten Miller-Zisholz, in Lansing, Michigan until June 2015.

Miller won the 2011 U.S. novice title. The next season, she won a bronze medal in her Junior Grand Prix debut and the U.S. junior national bronze medal.

In 2012–13, Miller won a pair of silver medals at JGP events in Austria and Croatia and qualified for the 2012–13 Junior Grand Prix Final in Sochi, Russia. She won the silver medal after placing second in the short program and fourth in the long. She made her senior national debut at the 2013 U.S. Championships, finishing 10th.

In September 2014, making her senior international debut, Miller took the silver medal at the Lombardia Trophy, an ISU Challenger Series (CS) event in Sesto San Giovanni, Italy. In November, she won gold at the CS Ice Challenge in Graz, Austria.

In June 2015, Miller relocated to Artesia, California to train under Rafael Arutyunyan. Miller-Zisholz, who encouraged her to move to a more competitive training environment, continues to work with Miller as an adviser and technical consultant. In August 2016, Miller announced a coaching change to Tammy Gambill.

Programs

Competitive highlights 
GP: Grand Prix; CS: Challenger Series; JGP: Junior Grand Prix

References

External links 

 
 

American female single skaters
1996 births
Living people
Figure skaters from Chicago
21st-century American women